Zdeněk Adamec (born January 9, 1956) is a retired javelin thrower, who represented Czechoslovakia in the 1980s. He finished seventh at the inaugural 1983 World Championships in Helsinki, Finland and seventeenth in his qualifying round at the 1987 World Championships in Rome.

Achievements

1New model javelin

References

1956 births
Living people
Czech male javelin throwers
Place of birth missing (living people)
Friendship Games medalists in athletics